Sir William Morgan (c. 1542 – 9 October 1583), of Langstone and Pencoed, Llanmartin, Monmouthshire, was a Welsh soldier and politician.

He was a Member (MP) of the Parliament of England for Monmouth Boroughs in 1572.

References

1542 births
1583 deaths
16th-century Welsh military personnel
People from Monmouthshire
English MPs 1572–1583
16th-century Welsh politicians